Tong Kit Siong is a Bruneian male karateka.

At the 2002 Asian Games Siong won the bronze medal in the men's kumite under-75 kg category, topping the repechage stage ahead of fellow bronze medallist Kim Byung-chul of South Korea. This made him the first ever individual men's medallist for Brunei at the Asian Games and only the fourth medallist in the country's history. He attempted to qualify at the 2006 Asian Games, but ultimately did not compete.

He won the second international medal of his career at the 2005 Southeast Asian Games. Initially third placed, he was upgraded to the silver medal after Malaysia's runner-up Rayner Kin Sion was disqualified for doping. This gave Brunei three silver medallists in the sport, alongside HJ Johari and Sim Chung Hlang in the lower weight categories. For his efforts, Siong was awarded a US$3000 prize by Bruneian officials for excellence in sport.

See also
List of Asian Games medalists in karate

References

Living people
Year of birth missing (living people)
Place of birth missing (living people)
Bruneian male karateka
Bruneian people of Chinese descent
Asian Games medalists in karate
Karateka at the 2002 Asian Games
Asian Games bronze medalists for Brunei
Medalists at the 2002 Asian Games
Southeast Asian Games medalists for Brunei
Southeast Asian Games medalists in karate
Competitors at the 2005 Southeast Asian Games